Bill "Tex" Henson (July 20, 1924 - December 2, 2002) was an American animator and story artist who began his career at Disney in 1944 and later worked for Famous Studios during his early career. He is credited with having named Disney's chipmunk duo "Chip 'n' Dale". In the 1960s, he was a supervising animator on The Rocky and Bullwinkle Show.

Henson also taught art at Eastfield College near Garland and Mesquite, Texas and he also had an early career in advertising animation. In 1995 he also did some art design and writing  for The Sunny Shopper a free distribution publication owned by Michael and Josh Fuller.

Henson was killed on December 2, 2002, at the age of 78, after being struck by a vehicle while crossing a street in Terrell, Texas.

External links
 Bio for Tex Henson at HonoraryUnsubscribe
 Obituary for Tex Henson
 
 

Animators from Texas
Walt Disney Animation Studios people
Pedestrian road incident deaths
1924 births
2002 deaths
Road incident deaths in Texas
Famous Studios people